Luca Rossetti may refer to:

 Luca Rossetti (painter), Italian painter and architect of the 18th century
 Luca Rossetti (racing driver), Italian rally driver

See also
 Luca Rossettini